All Night Long is a British sitcom starring Keith Barron that aired in 1994. It was written by Dick Fiddy and Mark Wallington, and was produced and directed by Harold Snoad, who also produced and directed Keeping Up Appearances.

Cast
Keith Barron – Bill Chivers
Maureen Beattie – Vanda
Dinah Sheridan – Clare
Angus Lennie – Tom
Jan Winters – WPC Hannah Jackson
John Phythian – PC Digby
Jacqueline Reddin – Terry
Robert McKewley – Courtney
Paul Grunert – Wally

Plot
All Night Long was set in a bakery in London, and showed the employees working during the night to prepare the bread for local hotels and cafés. Bill Chivers, who owned the business, had learnt bakery while in prison for armed robbery, and was determined to be a law abider. He employed Vanda, a Romanian, Scottish Tom and Courtney who was given a job after breaking into the bakery in the first episode. Clare was a disabled crime writer, who was inspired by the bakery, Wally was a cab driver and PC Digby and WPC Jackson were the local police officers.

Episodes
Episode One (11 July 1994)
Episode Two (18 July 1994)
Episode Three (25 July 1994)
Episode Four (1 August 1994)
Episode Five (15 August 1994)
Episode Six (22 August 1994)

References
Mark Lewisohn, "Radio Times Guide to TV Comedy", BBC Worldwide Ltd, 2003
British TV Comedy Guide for All Night Long

External links

1994 British television series debuts
1994 British television series endings
1990s British sitcoms
BBC television sitcoms
Television shows set in London